Avilés is a Spanish surname. Notable people with the surname include:

Alicia Avilés, educator and community leader in Costa Rica
Caleb Avilés, former member of the boy band MDO
Gabriel de Avilés, 2nd Marquis of Avilés, governor of Chile, viceroy of Río de la Plata, and viceroy of Peru
Lucho Avilés (1938–2019), Uruguayan-born Argentine journalist and television presenter
Óscar Avilés (1924–2014), Peruvian musician
Pedro Avilés, Spanish writer
Pedro Menéndez de Avilés (1519–1574), first governor of Spanish Florida & governor of colonial Cuba
Ramón Avilés, Puerto Rican baseball player
Raúl Avilés, Ecuadorian footballer 
René Avilés Fabila, Mexican writer

Spanish-language surnames